This is a timeline documenting the events of heavy metal in the year 1977.

Newly formed bands 
707
 44 Magnum
Bad Brains
 Barnabas
 Black Death
 Death SS
 Dedringer
 Def Leppard
 Discharge
 Divlje Jagode
 Gordi
 Gravestone
 Great White
 Holocaust
 The Hunt
 Kix
 Manilla Road
 Misfits
 Oz
Perfect
 Quartz
Ram Jam
 Rock Goddess
Saga
 Samson
 Sarcofagus
 Saxon
 TKO
Törr
 Trance
 Trust
 Vatreni Poljubac

Albums

March

April

May

June

July

August

September

October

November

December

Release date unknown
 Goddo - Goddo
 Ram Jam - Ram Jam
 Quartz - Quartz
 Thor - Keep the Dogs Away
 Angel - On Earth as It Is in Heaven

Disbandments 
 T. Rex

Events 
 Queen release "We Will Rock You" and "We Are the Champions".

References

1970s in heavy metal music
Metal